Deportivo Rayo Zuliano is a western Venezuelan professional football club based in Maracaibo. Founded in 2005, the club play in the Venezuelan Primera División, hosting their home matches at the Estadio José Pachencho Romero.

History
The club was later in the inaugural season of the Venezuelan Tercera División, narrowly missing out promotion to Segunda División B in 2007–08 and later achieving mid-table campaigns in 2008–09 and 2009–10.

After an eighth position finish in their group in 2021, the club led their group in 2022, but were knocked out in the promotion phase.

On 12 December 2022, it was announced that Rayo Zuliano would merge with Primera División side Zulia, taking their place in the top tier. The merger was officially confirmed on 28 January 2023.

Managers
 Alex García King (2021–22)
 Elvis Martínez (2023–)

References

External links
 

Association football clubs established in 2005
Football clubs in Venezuela
2005 establishments in Venezuela
Sport in Maracaibo